Amy Lynnette Vilela (born 1974 or 1975) is an American politician from the state of Nevada. She worked as an accountant before becoming an advocate for single-payer healthcare, also known as Medicare for All, after her daughter was turned away from a hospital and died of a heart attack because the hospital thought she lacked health insurance.

Vilela ran for the United States House of Representatives in 2018 and 2022, and co-chaired the Nevada campaign for the Bernie Sanders 2020 presidential campaign.

Early life, education, and career
Vilela was born in Maryland. Her father was an ironworker and her mother was a secretary. They divorced during her childhood. Vilela became a mother when she was a teenager. She ended up homeless while raising her children, and used public assistance. She earned a bachelor's degree in business and accounting from Park University in Missouri.

She became the chief financial officer of the Tammy Lynn Center, a nonprofit organization serving people with intellectual and developmental disabilities. She then became the chief financial officer at Foresee Consulting, a construction management consulting firm.

Political career
Vilela met Kihuen at a forum in 2017, where he declined to support Medicare for All. Kihuen dropped out of the race due to an unrelated scandal, and Steven Horsford won with 62% of the vote, while Vilela finished in third with 9%. The documentary Knock Down the House showcased Vilela's campaign, alongside the primary campaigns of Alexandria Ocasio-Cortez, Paula Jean Swearengin, and Cori Bush, three other Democrats who ran for Congress in the 2018 midterm elections. It premiered at the 2019 Sundance Film Festival and was released on Netflix on May 1, 2019.

During the 2020 United States presidential election, Vilela served as the Nevada state co-chair for the Bernie Sanders 2020 presidential campaign. Vilela received 20.1% of the vote in the primary, losing to Titus, who received 79.9%.

Personal life
Vilela married David, a United States Air Force officer, in 2009. They are raising four children.

In 2015, Vilela's 22-year-old daughter died of a heart attack. She had presented to Centennial Hills Hospital with the symptoms of a deep vein thrombosis. Sometime later, following a flight, the blood clot broke off and became a pulmonary embolism. Following her daughter's death, Vilela became an advocate for Medicare for All. She founded a Nevada chapter of Healthcare-NOW!, which lobbies for single-payer healthcare. In 2017, she filed a lawsuit against Centennial Hills Hospital.

References

External links
 Campaign website

1970s births
20th-century American women
21st-century American women
American health activists
Candidates in the 2018 United States elections
Candidates in the 2022 United States House of Representatives elections
Living people
Nevada Democrats
Park University alumni
People from Maryland
Politicians from Las Vegas
Women in Nevada politics